"I Will Be There" is a song written by Tom Snow and Jennifer Kimball, and recorded by American country music singer Dan Seals.  It was released in January 1987 as the second single from his album On the Front Line.  It peaked at #1 which was his fifth straight number-one single.

Charts

References

1987 singles
1986 songs
Dan Seals songs
Songs written by Tom Snow
Songs written by Jennifer Kimball
Song recordings produced by Kyle Lehning
EMI Records singles